Ujjayi (Sanskrit, "victorious") is a breathing technique employed in a variety of yoga practices. In relation to yoga, it is sometimes called "the ocean breath." Unlike some other forms of pranayama, the ujjayi breath is typically done in association with asana practice in some styles of yoga as exercise, such as Ashtanga Vinyasa Yoga.

Etymology
"Ujjayi" comes from the Sanskrit prefix "ud" (उद्) added to it and root "ji" (जि): "ujji" (उज्जि), meaning "to be victorious". Ujjayi (उज्जायी), thus means "one who is victorious".

Technique
Ujjayi breath is a type of diaphragmatic breath where the throat muscles of the glottis are slightly constricted, causing the air to produce a whispering, audible vibration as it passes in and out the vocal cords.  Inhalation and exhalation are both done through the nose, and the resultant sound must be audible enough for the user to hear it, but not so loud for someone standing six feet away to hear it. The inhalations and exhalations are equal in duration, and are controlled in a natural manner that causes no distress to the practitioner.

This sound naturally calms the mind and draws attention to breath, helping internalize awareness, and keeps the breath smooth and even. Practicing ujjayi also allows the user to regulate and control the flow of breath and the movement of the diaphragm. It also helps cleanining the throat and lungs, bringing up excess phlegm and mucous, and strengthens the diaphragm and the throat muscles.

Benefits
According to Tirumalai Krishnamacharya, who taught the creators of Ashtanga Vinyasa Yoga, Iyengar Yoga and others,  Ujjayi Pranayama is a balancing and calming breath which increases oxygenation and builds internal body heat. 

Ujjayi breathing may be used continuously throughout Ashtanga Vinyasa Yoga, and is frequently used in Power Yoga and Vinyasa, or Flow Yoga. This breathing technique enables the practitioner to maintain a rhythm to his or her practice, take in enough oxygen, and helps build energy to maintain the practice, while clearing toxins out of the bodily system. This breath is especially important during the transition into and out of asanas (postures), as it helps practitioners to stay present, self-aware and grounded in the practice, which lends it a meditative quality.

Ujjayi Breath is also known as Ujjayi Pranayama. Ujjayi sometimes referred to as "cobra breathing", is also a helpful way for the yogi or yogini to keep the vital life force, prana, circulating throughout the body rather than escaping from it. Ujjayi is said to be similar to the breathing of a new-born baby before the prana begins to flow out into the world's attractions.

See also
Kapalabhati
Pranayama
Pratiloma ujjayi is a variant of ujjayi breathing, inhaling and exhaling through alternate nostrils

References

External links

Pranayama